Philip M. Bilden (born 1964) is an American businessman and private equity & venture capital investor. He was nominated by President Donald Trump to serve as the 76th United States Secretary of the Navy in January, 2017, although he subsequently withdrew himself from consideration.  He is a philanthropist and advocate for national security, the U.S. Navy, and cybersecurity.

Early life and education
Philip M. Bilden was born in 1964, the son of a Navy officer with numerous duty stations across the United States. He attended eight American public primary and secondary schools in five states. Bilden lived in Zionsville, Indiana, graduating from Zionsville Community High School in 1982. He was class valedictorian. He was awarded both Army ROTC and Navy ROTC scholarships and opted for the Army scholarship when he enrolled at Georgetown University. Bilden graduated with a Bachelor of Science in Foreign Service, magna cum laude, in 1986 with a concentration in International Politics focused in Soviet Bloc studies and a proficiency in Spanish. He received Georgetown's W. Coleman Nevils Award for U.S. Diplomatic History for his thesis, "Alfred Thayer Mahan's Theory of Sea Power". He graduated as a Distinguished Military Graduate, United States Army Reserve Officers' Training Corps, where he was awarded the President's Cup as the top graduate of the Georgetown Army ROTC brigade. He received his MBA from Harvard Business School in 1991.

Military service 
From 1986 to 1996, Bilden served in the U.S. Army Reserve as a military intelligence officer. He was commissioned as a Second Lieutenant and served through the rank of Captain at Strategic Military Intelligence Detachments supporting the Defense Intelligence Agency. He resigned his commission in 1996 upon relocating to Hong Kong. Bilden is the third of seven men in his family to have served over four consecutive generations in the U.S. Navy and U.S. Army since World War II.

Business leadership & career
Bilden is Chairman and Managing Partner of Shield Capital, a venture capital firm he founded to invest in emerging national security technologies.  Shield Capital announced a strategic partnership with aerospace & defense company, L3 Harris Technologies (NYSE: LHX) to pursue early stage investments in frontier technologies including cybersecurity, artificial intelligence, autonomy, and space intelligence, surveillance, and reconnaissance (ISR).  Bilden was a co-founding member of the private equity firm HarbourVest Partners, which manages over $42 billion in assets. He began his career in Boston in 1991 and relocated to Hong Kong in 1996 to establish the firm's Asian subsidiary. Bilden was responsible for the firm's investment strategy and execution, capital raising, and client service activities throughout the Asia Pacific region, managing personnel and partnerships in multiple countries and cultures. Throughout his 25-year tenure at HarbourVest Partners, Bilden served in senior leadership roles in the firm's global management, including the firm's six person executive committee responsible for governance. He became a founding member of the firm following the management buyout of HarbourVest's predecessor company in 1997.  He became a senior advisor of HarbourVest in January 2012. After 25 years at the firm, Bilden retired in 2016.

Bilden served on the advisory boards of several international private equity partnerships, including funds managed by Archer Capital (Australia), Bain Capital Asia, Brait Capital Partners (South Africa), Castle Harlan Australian Mezzanine Partners (CHAMP), KKR Asia, Latin American Enterprise Fund, Olympus Capital (Asia), Pacific Equity Partners (Australia), TPG Asia, and Unitas Capital (Asia). Bilden served as inaugural Chairman of the Emerging Markets Private Equity Association 2011–2012.

Bilden was awarded the Asia Venture Capital Journal Special Achievement award for "outstanding contribution to private equity in the region" upon completion of his 15th year managing the firm's Asia business. He was named among "Asia's 25 Most Influential People in Private Equity" by Asian Investor.

Bilden served on the Board of Directors of Huntington Ingalls Industries (NYSE: HII), America's largest military shipbuilding company, from 2017-2022, including as Chairman of HII's Cybersecurity Committee.  Bilden serves on the Board of Directors of GoSecure and Authentic8, venture capital funded cybersecurity companies, and the Advisory Board of international equity manager, Contrast Capital.

Secretary of the Navy nomination 
On January 25, 2017, President Trump announced his intention to nominate Bilden to be the United States Secretary of the Navy.  Bilden announced his decision to respectfully withdraw from consideration as 76th Secretary of the Navy in a statement issued by the Pentagon on February 26, 2017 noting his inability to serve without materially adverse financial divestiture of private family assets. Bilden outlined key challenges facing the 76th Secretary of the Navy due to a decade of budgetary disinvestment and the increasingly complex security environment facing the U.S. Navy.  Bilden advised the next Secretary of the Navy to take urgent action to reverse the Navy and Marine Corps readiness and modernization deficit, develop a strategic plan for the fleet of the future, and partner with the Congress and industry to develop a multi-year procurement plan.

National security and cybersecurity advocacy & philanthropy
Bilden serves on several boards of public policy, non-profit, educational, and philanthropic organizations supporting military veterans, national and regional security, and cybersecurity missions.  He serves as Chairman of the Board of Trustees of the Naval War College Foundation, where he also served as Vice Chairman and as the inaugural Chairman of the Center for Cyber Conflict Studies and the Cyber & Tech Council of Business Executives for National Security.   He previously served on the Chief of Naval Operations Executive Panel (U.S. Navy), the Board of Directors of the United States Naval Academy Foundation; the Board of Directors, U.S. Naval Institute; the Board of Advisors of Georgetown University School of Foreign Service; and the Asia Pacific Advisory Board and Dean's Board of Advisors of Harvard Business School.

Personal life 
Bilden and his wife, Patricia Bilden, have been married three decades and are residents of Palm Beach, Florida.  They attended Georgetown University together and subsequently were married at Holy Trinity Church in Georgetown.  Patricia is a retired dermatologist originally from Iowa. The Bildens have three adult children who were educated in Hong Kong for two decades and are fluent in Mandarin Chinese.   The Bilden's two sons commissioned from the U.S. Naval Academy and serve in the U.S. Navy.

References

1964 births
American venture capitalists
Businesspeople from Newport, Rhode Island
Walsh School of Foreign Service alumni
Harvard Business School alumni
Living people
United States Army reservists
Rhode Island Republicans
American philanthropists
People from Zionsville, Indiana
People from Palm Beach, Florida